Peter Bruch (born 25 September 1955) is a German former swimmer who competed in the 1972 Summer Olympics.

References

1955 births
Living people
German male swimmers
German male freestyle swimmers
Olympic swimmers of East Germany
Swimmers at the 1972 Summer Olympics
Olympic bronze medalists for East Germany
Olympic bronze medalists in swimming
World Aquatics Championships medalists in swimming
Medalists at the 1972 Summer Olympics
20th-century German people
21st-century German people